This is a complete list of the 188 blue plaques placed by English Heritage and its predecessors in the Royal Borough of Kensington and Chelsea.

At inception in 1876 the scheme was originally administered by the Royal Society of Arts, being taken over by the London County Council (LCC) in 1901. The Greater London Council (GLC) took over the scheme in 1965 from its predecessor. Since the abolition of the GLC in 1986, the blue plaque scheme has been administered by English Heritage.

o

|}

See also
 List of English Heritage blue plaques in London

References

External links

English Heritage  – Blue plaques

Blue plaques in Kensington and Chelsea
Lists of buildings and structures in London
Kensington and Chelsea
Royal Borough of Kensington and Chelsea